{{Infobox settlement
| name                     = Ichalkaranji
| native_name              = 
| settlement_type          = City
| nickname                 = Manchester City of Maharashtra
| image_skyline            = Rajwada.jpg
| image_alt                = Ichalkaranji
| image_caption            = Palace of Ichalkaranji
| pushpin_map              = India Maharashtra
| pushpin_label_position   = middle
| pushpin_map_alt          = 
| pushpin_map_caption      = Location in Maharashtra, India, known as Manchester City of Maharashtra
| coordinates              = 
| subdivision_type         = Country
| subdivision_name         = 
| subdivision_type1        = State
| subdivision_type2        = District
| subdivision_name1        = Maharashtra
| subdivision_name2        = Kolhapur
| established_title        = | established_date         = 
| founder                  = 
| named_for                = 
| government_type          = Municipal Corporation
| governing_body           = Ichalkaranji Municipal Corporation
| leader_title             = ------
| unit_pref                = Metric
| area_footnotes           = 
| area_total_km2           = 49.84
| area_rank                = 
| elevation_footnotes      = 
| elevation_m              = 539
| population_total         = 287,570
| population_as_of         = 2011
| population_footnotes     = 
| population_density_km2   = auto
| population_rank          = 151
| population_demonym       = 
| demographics_type1       = Languages
| demographics1_title1     = Official
| demographics1_info1      = Marathi
| timezone1                = IST
| utc_offset1              = +5:30
| postal_code_type         = PIN
| postal_code              = 416115/16/17
| area_code                = 0230
| area_code_type           = Telephone code
| registration_plate       = MH-09
| footnotes                = 
| blank3_name_sec1         = Lok Sabha constituency
| blank3_info_sec1         = Hatkanangale
| blank4_name_sec1         = Vidhan Sabha constituency
| blank4_info_sec1         = Ichalkaranji
| blank5_name_sec1         = Civic agency
| blank5_info_sec1         = Ichalkaranji Municipal corporation
}}Ichalkaranji ([it͡səlkəɾəɳd͡ʒiː]) is a city in Kolhapur District, Indian state of Maharashtra, governed by a municipal corporation. It is known for its textile manufacturing industry and "Manchester City of Maharashtra". Ichalkaranji is located between boundaries of Sangli & Kolhapur districts

History

Ichalkaranji was a Maratha jhagir situated on the banks of Panchganga River. It was ruled by a  Ghorpade family for two centuries until 1947.
The dynasty of Maratha rulers of Ichalkaranji has its origin in the middle of the seventeenth century. At that time, a poor Brahmin widow, by the surname of Joshi, from the coastal Konkan village of Mhapan, near Vengurla, in the present-day Sindhudurg district, moved east over the mountainous Western ghats with her seven-year-old son, Naro Mahadeo, to the village of Kapshi. The Maratha general Santaji Ghorpade, hailed from that village. Naro Mahadeo early took a keen interest in the cavalry horses of the general and one day persuaded a syce to allow him to ride a fiery warhorse to the river to drink water. This stolen ride was observed by the alert Santaji, who roundly scolded the syce, but also began to take a deep interest in the prodigal boy, who rode so well without any formal training. Benefited by the general's personal attention. Naro, in turn, served Santaji loyally and both developed affection for each other. Naro performed heroically and gallantly. As Naro Mahadeo proved his ability, he was promoted and later on was rewarded with tax collecting fiefs(Inams). Out of gratitude to his benefactor, Naro went on to change his surname from Joshi to Ghorpade, which to this day is the surname of the dynasty of rulers of Ichalkaranji.

Venkatrao, the son of Naro Mahadeo married Anubai, the youngest daughter of Balaji Vishwanath Bhat, who very soon became the Prime Minister or Peshwa, of Chhatrapati Shahu Maharaj. Because of this alliance with the Peshwa family, the rulers of Ichalkaranji came into more and more prominence. Venkatrao becoming a Sardar of Shahu Maharaj, and receiving additional Inams and grants from time to time because of his prowess and great ability as a general, fighting against the forces of Kolhapur and Portuguese from Goa.

As described by Horace George Franks in the book The Story of Ichalkaranji (1929), there were ups and downs. But the women of the House of Ichalkaranji rulers were always ready to defend and also advance the interests of Ichalkaranji with as much courage and shrewdness as the men. An outstanding example of this is Anubai, the wife of Venkatrao.

Narayanrao Babasaheb was the eighth ruler. He ascended the seat in the year 1892. His rule was marked with progressive measures in all departments of the administration. As a young man, he had a very well-rounded and advanced education, making it a point to select those subjects which would be of special benefit in administrative affairs. In addition, he had traveled far and wide, visiting Java, Malay Peninsula, Ceylon (Sri Lanka) and Burma. He had also visited England and the Continent three times. He took a keen interest in the cultural as well as material and social welfare of his people. He patronized the study of art and Indian classical music, from basic to the advanced stages, also offering prizes in the art exhibitions at Pune and Mumbai. He established scholarships in several art colleges of Maharashtra and for students going abroad for their professional education. Shrimant Narayanrao Babasaheb was a patron of culture and an enlightened ruler.
Narayanrao Babasaheb Ghorpade was responsible for developing the Ichalkaranji City into an industrial town. He was the main source of inspiration for the development of both the decentralized textile industry as well as the co-operative movement. He encouraged Vitthalrao Datar, a young entrepreneur of the town, to install a power loom in 1904. The foresighted ruler gave royal patronage by extending financial assistance as well as free land to the weavers and other enterprising entrepreneurs. During his visit to Denmark and other western countries, the chief had access to the co-operative sector of these countries and was impressed with their success. On his return to India, he vowed to exercise this movement for the benefit of his subjects, to reform the microeconomics of the town for prosperity, growth and Self-sustainability of the society.

Geography and climate

It has an average elevation of 538 metres (1768 ft).

Ichalkaranji (Hatkanangale T.; 16° 40' N; 74° 25' E; p. 27,423; an 8.7 square miles), lies in the Panchganga valley about eighteen miles (29 km) east of Kolhapur and half a mile north of the river. It is six miles (10 km) south-east of Hatkanangale railway station. The town is formed of seven hamlets.

Civic administration

The civic administration of the city is managed by the Ichalkaranji Municipal Corporation, as per government GR dated on 5 May 2022, which was established as a municipal council in 1904. The municipality oversees the engineering works, health, sanitation, water supply, administration and taxation in the city. It is headed by a Municipal President who is assisted by the municipal chief officer and council members. The city is divided into 65 wards and the council members (also known as councilors) are elected by the citizens of Ichalkaranji every five years. The citizens directly elect the Municipal President. The growth and expansion of the city are managed by the Ichalkaranji Municipal Council which is headed by a municipal chief officer. Its activities include developing new layouts and roads, town planning and land acquisition. The electrical supply to the city is managed by the Maharashtra State Electricity Distribution Company Limited (MAHADISCOM).

The citizens of Ichalkaranji elect one representative, currently Mr. Prakash Kallappa Awade,to the Maharashtra Vidhan Sabha through the constituency of Ichalkaranji. The 21 letterboxes have been installed in the city by Mr. Halvankar on 18 July 2010 to communicate with the people of his constituency and address their grievances. He have been receiving numerous complaints and suggestions. In November 2019 the citizens of Ichalkaranji reelected Mr. Prakash Awade as their MLA, to represent them in Vidhan Sabha. Ichalkaranji city, being a part of the larger Hatkanangale Lok Sabha constituency, also elects one member, fermer Mr. Raju Shetti, to the Lok Sabha, the lower house of the Indian Parliament, in office from 2009 to 2019.Currently from 2019, MP is Dhairyasheel Sambhajirao Mane from Shiv Sena.

Politics in the city are dominated by three political parties: the Indian National Congress (INC), the Bharatiya Janata Party (BJP), and the Nationalist Congress Party. City is on the brink of public health and environmental emergency, requiring immediate remedial action.

Demographics

As per provisional reports of Census India, population of Ichalkaranji in 2011 is 287,570; of which male and female are 149,691 and 137,879 respectively. Although Ichalkaranji city has population of 287,570; its urban / metropolitan population is 325,709 of which 169,870 are males and 155,839 are females. Ichalkaranji has an average Literacy Rate of 85.98%, higher than the national average of 59.5%: male literacy is 91%, and female literacy is 66%. In Ichalkaranji, 13% of the population is under 6 years of age.
The city's population as shown above is excludes newly developed industrial and residential areas, villages that have been annexed by Ichalkaranji (known as part of the city) but having gram panchayat such as Kabnur, Yadrao and Korochi etc. Village Shahapur, Ichalkaranji was included in Ichalkaranji Municipal Council in 1985.  Considering this city's metropolitan population is over 3 lakh. Marathi is the official and most spoken language. Other spoken languages are Hindi, Bhojpuri, English and Urdu.

Business and economy

Ichalkaranji also ranks among city's with high ownership of consumer products such as home appliances and fast-moving consumer goods.

Industry

Approximately 40% of new automobile sales in Kolhapur district is from Ichalkaranji
Catchment area. Maruti Suzuki, Tata Motors, Hero, Bajaj, Honda and TVS Motor have authorized sales and services centres in Ichalkaranji. Suzuki and Yamaha also have their service centres in Ichalkaranji.

Ichalkaranji is one of the fastest-growing industrial areas in Maharashtra and has even been termed the "Manchester of Maharashtra". Having mixed community from all parts of India this is a cosmopolitan town by true means. The city's economy is driven predominantly by the textile industry.Engineering is the second largest industry in the city. There is much progressive agriculture in the area surrounding the city. Almost all banks in India have a branch in the city. Textile goods manufactured in the city are sold all over India as well as exported to various parts of the world. Traders use Centralized Online Real-time Exchange Core Banking facility for financial transactions. Indian Settlement Systems such as Real-time gross settlement RTGS and National Electronic Funds Transfer NEFT System is also available in almost all branches of banks in the city. Despite all these Bankers clearing house in the city processes approximately 12000 Cheques on each working day. Clearing house is managed by the State Bank of India.CTS clearing has been started. Most of the Insurance and companies in India have offices in the city.

Textile industry
The town produces one crore meter of yarn every day that translates into a business of Rs 45 crore a day. Of the total production, 15 percent is directly exported while another 40 percent is for indirect export after processing. According to locals, over 50,000 weavers depend on their livelihood working in the power looms in town.

The weaver community was overwhelmed by the mention of Ichalkaranji in the Finance Minister's speech and welcomed the cluster which, they say, will help them fare better in the global market.

Before 1980 Ichalkaranji was known for cotton poplin, dhoti, and cotton saris. In the mid-1980s, weavers of the city started producing denim, canvas, chiffon, and fabric for school uniforms (khaki drill). Fabrics such as seersucker, Oxford, herringbone, ripstop, chambray, tweed, and twill made in or around the Ichalkaranji city are used by many domestic and international fashion brands such as Raymond's of India, Armani, Banana Republic, Hugo Boss, and Paul Smith.

The presence of a qualified workforce and the level of technical know-how and easy accessibility to finest weavers of Ichalkaranji for outsourcing and over all good social ambiance were among the factors that influenced Italian textile major Tessitura Monti, Turkish textile maker 'Soktas', Bombay Rayon Fashions Ltd (BRFL), Raymond Zambaiti Ltd (A joint venture of Raymond's Ltd and internationally renowned Cotonificio Honegger S.P.A., part of Gruppo Zambaiti), German Menswear brands Liebe, Boys R Bad and Looty etc. while planning investment near Ichalkaranji city.

Spinning
In 1962 the Deccan Co-operative Spinning Mill Ltd. came into existence in Ichalkaranji, which was the first Co-operative Spinning Mill in Asia. As of 2010 over 20 modern spinning mills this region has become one of the major centre for spinning mills in India. Some of these spinning mills are 100% Export Oriented Units of Cotton Yarn.SizingYarn sizing is a preparatory process before the weaving. This process gives strength to yarn. The city has approximately 175 sizing units,
working 24 hours a day, 6 days a week.

Engineering industryTata Nano small car is very similar to Meera, a small car developed in 1970 by Shankarrao Kulkarni of Ichalkaranji. The city is also known for Fundamental Measuring instrument manufacturing industry. These testing machines are used in engineering and other manufacturing industries, engineering institutes and research institutes for analysis. These measuring instruments are marketed in India as well as in some other countries. Measuring instruments manufactured in city by varies companies include compression testing machines, torsion testing machines, horizontal chain, and rope testing machines, spring testing machine, impact testing machine, Erichsen testing machines, universal testing machines, Rockwell scale hardness tester, Brinell scale hardness tester, and computerized Vickers hardness test.

The city's economy. driven by the engineering goods manufacturing industry (which has been around since the 1950s). Several automotive component manufacturers have the plant's in or around the city, who are vendors for companies such as:
Maruti Udyog Ltd, Honda Motorcycle, Bajaj Auto, TVS Suzuki, Kehin Fie, Tata Motors, Kirloskar Brothers Limited, Mahindra & Mahindra, MICO.  Emmel Vheelers has a manufacturing unit of hybrid three-wheeler, e-motorcycle, high-power scooters, and electric scooters in Ichalkaranji.

Agriculture

The city is surrounded by five Sugar refinerys, Annually they processes Over 5000000 metric ton of Sugarcane, as of 2009 Sugarcane prices of 2600 per ton Sugarcane farmers itself bring in approximately Rs. 13000000000 (13 billion) to the economy of the city's Catchment area. Four out of five sugar mills have Co-generation plants. The oldest of these five sugar mills is Deshbhakta Ratnappa Kumbhar Panchaganga Sahakari Sakhar Karkhana Ltd, founded by Dr. Ratnappa Kumbhar, an Indian independence activist who signs the final draft of the Constitution of India. Shree Renuka Sugars Ltd, one of the leading sugar companies in India, has set up a Bagasse based 30 Megawatt Cogeneration power plant in Ichalkaranji.

People and culture

Ichalkaranji is also well known for its cultural activities and has a rich cultural heritage. People from different parts of India live in Ichalkaranji and celebrates their cultural festivals peacefully. Almost all festivals in different religions are celebrated in Ichalkaranj especially Diwali, Ganesh Chaturthi, Holi, and Dasera are the attractions. Also, about 15% population being migrated from Bikaner, Nagour Rajasthan, all the major festivals of Rajasthan like Gan Gour, Teej, Holi are celebrated here with great joy. Other festivals like Ramnavami, Mahesh Navami are celebrated with the large participation of all the communities.

Ichalkaranji is also a home of pandit Balakrishnabuwa Ichalkaranjikar, Pioneer of classical vocal singing in Maharashtra. Born in 1849, Balkrishnabua received his training from Pandit Vasudeobua Joshi, who belonged to the school of Haddu-Hassu Khan. He also received his guidance from Ustad Mahmed Khan, the elder brother of Rahimat Khan and eldest son of Haddu Khan. After his training in Gwalior, Balkrishnabua came to Mumbai and the Miraj. As the climate of Miraj seemed to suit him he desired to settle down there. Balkrishnabua's fame began to draw disciples from surrounding places. His disciples included Gundubua, Vishnu Digambar Paluskar, Mirashi buwa, Anant Manohar Joshi of Aundh, Nilkanthabua Jangam, Vamanbua Chaphekar, his son Annabua Ichalkaranjikar, etc. His style of singing was pure Gwalior of Haddu Hassu Khan vintage.  His contribution is remarkable in bringing the Gwalior gharana gayaki to Maharashtra and for popularising it. Pandit Balakrishnabuwa Ichalkaranjikar died in 1926 at the age of 77 years. The city has an art school name after him 'Gayanacharya Pandit Balakrishnabuwa Ichalkaranjikar Sangeet Sadhana Mandal', which is devoted to Indian Classical Music hosts cultural programs throughout the year which helps in spreading cultural awareness amongst Society.

In 1974 the city of Ichalkaranji proudly hosted Akhil Bharatiya Marathi Sahitya Sammelan, the conference for literary discussions by Marathi writers. President of this Sahitya Sammelan was Mr.Purushottam Laxman Deshpande. Popularly known by his initials पु. ल. ("Pu. La.") a legendary writer and film and stage actor, music composer, harmonium player, singer, and orator.

The city also is a home for The FIE Foundation, a charitable trust established in 1970, belongs to the 'Fie Group of Industries' in Ichalkaranji. The Chairman of the FIE Group, Shri P. D. Kulkarni, established the 'Fie Foundation' trust to recognize and reward eminent personalities and budding talents in a variety of fields. The awards are generally selected from the following fields: Engineering, Science and Technology, Humanities, Education, Agriculture, Music and Arts, Sports, Literature, Child Artist, and local talents. The highest award conferred is the Rashtrabhushan Award. The awards are given annually in a ceremony held in Ichalkaranji in January or February. A few of the chief guests who have graced the occasion are honorable Ex. Prime minister of India Shri. Chandra Shekhar, Hon'ble Ex. Chief Minister of Maharashtra Shri. Manohar Joshi, cine actor Dilip Kumar, and industrialist Shri Rahul Bajaj. Some of the 'Rashtrabhushan' awardees are Dr. Raja Ramanna, Ratan Tata, Lata Mangeshkar, T. N. Seshan, Brijmohan Lall Munjal and Kamal Haasan.

Medical Association of Ichalkaranji is a local Medico-Social service organization of qualified and duly registered medical practitioners of all systems of medicines practicing in Ichalkaranji and the outskirts of Ichalkaranji. The main aim of this association is to make available medical treatment either free or at minimum cost by establishing charitable institutes like T.B. Clinic, T.B. Sanitorium, General Hospital, Alliance Hospital, Adhar Kendra and to organize and develop all socio-medical activities and face local problems unitedly. So the Medical Association of Ichalkaranji came into existence in 1975. Activities of association includes, Free Counselling for underprivileged s, Elisa Testing for HIV in concessional rate, Symptomatic Treatment for opportunistic infections, Free Ante-natal ARV treatment to HIV+ve mothers and child, Free T.B. treatment to HIV +ve patients, Free Nirodh (condoms) supply and Social Awareness.

Seva Bharati is also one of the NGOs of the city, established in 1990 the organization works as a project-based NGO. In the year 1989, the birth centenary year of late Hon’ble K. B. Hedgewar, the founder of Rashtriya Swayamsevak Sangh, the idea transpired that some work, related to the service of the underprivileged people should be initiated in the city of Ichalkaranji. This is the inspiration of Seva Bharati, Ichalkaranji and from 1990 Organisation is working in the field of health, education, and related dimensions for the last 20 years. Seva Bharati has been able to spread its SEVA initiatives (service) in Ichalkaranji city itself and surrounding 12 villages, two of which are from Karnataka state.

Activities of Seva Bharati are Dr. Hedgewar Mobile clinic visiting nearby 12 villages, twice a week, treating @ 25000 patients every year. Pathological lab, established in 1993, serving for @ 5000 beneficiaries annually at nominal rates. OPD registering @ 6000 patients per year. Polyclinic having 8 specialist doctors on its panel, each one offering service of checkup and advice once in a week for needy patients. Daycare indoor unit 24-hour ambulance service at subsidized rates. Blood donation camps. Free health camps. Nutritious food for the malnourished children in Lalnagar slum of Ichalkaranji city. Free Child health checkup camps. Rescue and relief work for the victims of earthquakes in Killari (Dist. Latur) in September 1993 and Kutch (Gujarat) in 2001. Relief and rehabilitation work in 2005 and 2006 for the flood-affected people and medical treatment at the time of epidemics in Kolhapur district. Participation in periodic health campaigns like pulse polio, special health checkup camps for women and general checkup camps.

International clubs such as Rotary club, Lions Club organizing humanitarian service projects every year which are beneficial to the community. Sri Ramakrishna Satsang Mandal, Ichalkaranji a branch of Ramakrishna Math, Pune is doing humanitarian service projects such as dispensary and Tuition classes for school going boys from nearby slum area.

Cuisine
Numerous cafes are also spread throughout the city and dine-in options are available at many restaurants. 
Various Gharghuti Bhojanalya serve typical home-cooked Non-veg Marathi cuisine and street food options are available near the Sunder bag garden.  Usually Poha, sheera, Misal Pav, & upma is the preferred breakfast.

Infrastructure

The city has a water supply network in existence since 1873.

Indira Gandhi Memorial hospital: It is a 300-bed hospital with 4 AC operation theaters. The built-up area on ground floor and first floor each .
Drama Theater: Shrimant Narayanrao Babasaheb Ghorpade Natyagrah. It is the unique theater in western Maharashtra. Seating capacity for 1200 persons. Fully air-conditioned theater. This is the only air-conditioned theater in south-west Maharashtra.It can be compared with the "Kalidas Theatre" in Nashik. The plans where prepared by Kirloskar consultants, Pune. The plot area is about 19,129 m.
Rajaram Stadium : Work Started – 31 January 1987 – Work completed – 7 August 2002, Cost Rs. The cricket ground having a radius of 70 meters. The plans are prepared by Pratap Achalkar, a well-known Architect and Ranaji Player. Ranji Trophy matches are played on this ground. The total plot area is about 25436 sqm that with the capacity of Auditorium is 20,000
Olympic Size Swimming pool: Work Started – 16 August 1992 – Work Completed – 23 December 1998, Cost – Rs., To encourage the city's swimmers Municipal Council has constructed an Olympic-size swimming pool. State-level swimming Tournaments are held every year. Maintenance of this Swimming pool is done properly by the municipal authority.Textile Development Cluster : To enhance and improve the infrastructure facilities of the city, Municipal Council along with Ichalkaranji Co-operative Industrial Estate, Laxmi Co-operative Industrial Estate, Parvati Industrial Estate, and DKTE Textile and Engineering Institute have jointly come together and formed a Special Purpose Vehicle (SPV) company viz. "Ichalkaranji Textile Development Cluster Limited (ITDC). The individual members will contribute to the extent of about 50% of the project cost and the balance amount would come in from the grant in aid from the Department of Industrial Promotion and Policy, Government of India, under the Industrial Infrastructure up-gradation Scheme (IIUS).

'SPV BACKGROUND'

Ichalkaranji Textile Development Cluster (ITDC), a company, incorporated under the Companies Act, 1956, is a Special Purpose Vehicle promoted by Ichalkaranji to undertake infrastructure development projects under the IIUS. The main objects of the SPV company are:
To form a Textile Cluster, a local agglomeration of small, medium and large textile and ancillary enterprises, which are engaged in production, marketing range of related and complementary products and services
To provide adequate water supply, roads, drainage system, power facilities, common infrastructure facilities such as Waste processing plant for Textile Industries.
To develop markets, raw material bank, common processing center, industrial training center, common facility center, communication center, etc.
To provide facilities for quality improvement, common testing facilities, research and development
To provide fire-fighting facilities, common effluent treatment plant and to promote and develop critical infrastructure facilities for the textile trade, commerce, and industry

Education and research
Ichalkaranji has around 100 High-Schools with 3 international schools, around 20 colleges offering degree-level education in Arts, science, and commerce fields, 3 engineering colleges, 1 technical education institute and 1 research institute in engineering. Most of the schools and colleges are private and public or "municipal schools" (run by the local municipal council). The schooling system mainly offers Maharashtra State Board of Secondary and Higher Secondary Education as well as other boards such as the National Institute of Open Schooling (NIOS), Central Board for Secondary Education (CBSE) and so on. Marathi is the main language of instruction followed by English and Hindi.

Some of them are (alphabetical order) :

The Modern High School
Anantrao Bhide Vidya Mandir
Antar Bharati Vidyalaya (आंतरभारती विद्यालय)
Chate Institute
D.K.T.E. English Medium High School
D.K.T.E.Marathi Medium High School
DKTE Society's International School
D.K.T.E.S.'s Textile and Engineering Institute
Dattajirao Kadam Arts, Science, and Commerce college
Deshbhakt Babasaheb Khanjire Private Industrial Training Institute
Govindrao high school and junior college
Ichalkaranji Highschool
Manere Highschool and Jr. College
Kabnoor highschool and junior college.
MAI Bal Vidya Mandir
Kishor Career Point (KCP)
Saraswati High school.
Shahu High school
Shraddha Institute Of Career Development
Shri Gangamai Vidya Mandir
St. Alphonsa School.
The Modern High School
Vyankateshwara English School
Vyankatrao High School

Engineering research
FIE Research Institute – An advanced stage Research Institute formed to assist the activities of FIE and the surrounding engineering goods manufacturing industry in 1979.

Approved by Govt. of India's Department for Scientific and Industrial Research, as An autonomous R & D Unit.
Accredited by National Accreditation Board for Testing and Calibration Laboratories (NABL), in an accordance with ISO/IEC 17025.
The main objectives of Research Institute
Extension of knowledge in the field of natural and applied sciences.
Conducting experiments with a view to developing new raw materials,
processes, components, equipment &machines which are mainly import substitution.
Improvisation in the existing materials, processes, and machines.
Encouragement to the activities of the surrounding industries.

Medical research
Research on non-laparoscopic abdominal hysterectomy has been done By Dr. Vijay Benadikar, MD of the city and he has developed a new modification of the abdominal hysterectomy called "modified mini-Pfannenstiel hysterectomy" (non-laparoscopic). He has done more than 600 such procedures in the last 6–7 years. He has been invited and presented this lecture at:
The Silver Jubilee Congress of Medical Women's International Association, held in Sydney, Australia, in April 2001
South Korea (Asia Pacific Menopause Federation Meet)
American Association of Gynecologic Laparoscopists AAGL in USA, 2001 and 2002 (The Global Congress of Minimally Invasive Gynecology)

Media and communication
Mahasatta is the local newspaper of the city, while other Marathi language newspapers such as Sakaal, Pudhari, Loksatta, Lokmat, Kesari, Maharashtra Times, and Saamna are popular. Major English dailies in the city are The Times of India, The Indian Express Business Standard and The Economic Times. Major Hindi dailies in the city Navbharat Times, lokamat samachar (By lokamat group) and Vyapar (Hindi) of Janmabhoomi Group.

Star Maajha, Zee Marathi, Doordarshan Sahyadri, ETV Marathi, and Me Marathi are popular television channels. English and Hindi entertainment and news channels are watched as well. Ichalkaranji has had FM Radio services running for the last few years. Though Radio Tomato (Pudhari Publications). 94.3 MHz, Radio Mirchi (98.3 MHz) tops the popularity rating along with All India Radio FM (102.7 MHz).

Broadband Internet access, provider in the city is DataOne by BSNL Fixed Line telecom services are offered alongside GSM and Code division multiple access (CDMA) mobile services. Cell phone coverage is extensive, and the main service providers are Vodafone Essar, Airtel, BSNL, Reliance Communications, Idea Cellular, Aircel and Tata Indicom. Recently a 3G service has been launched by Vodafone Essar, Airtel, BSNL, Reliance Communications, Idea Cellular, Aircel and Tata Indicom. The work for laying Fibre optics for 4G is in progress.

Transport

Ichalkaranji is well connected by the neighboring cities and national highways by road. MSRTC runs bus service to Sangli every 15 minutes from Ichalkaranji. The public transport is mainly provided by MSRTC, KSRTC and private buses which serve to all major destinations in Maharashtra, Karnataka and Andhra Pradesh. Private bus services are connected to major cities like Mumbai, Pune, Nagpur, Sambhaji Nagar, Nashik , Shirdi, Bangalore, Mangalore, Hyderabad, Solapur, Surat, Ahmedabad, Panjim.  MSRTC provides bus service from Ichalkaranji to Kolhapur and Miraj every 15 minutes. Miraj  railway junction is also connected to the city via bus services. Even though railway stations and the Kolhapur airport are nearby Ichalkaranji itself is not connected by rail or air.Nearest railway stations Hatkanangale – 6 km
 Sangli city – 28 km
Rukadi –  12 km
Valivade – 18 km 
Vishrambag (Sangli) - 27 km
 Miraj Junction    – 30 km
 Kolhapur city – 34 km 
 jaysingpur – 15 kmNearest airport'''
Kolhapur – 30 km (Maharashtra 
Belgaum – 110 km (Karnataka)
Pune – 250 km (Maharashtra)
Mumbai – 389 km (Maharashtra) 
Aurangabad− 400 km(Maharashtra)

Notable people
 
 
Kallappa Awade, an Indian politician, elected to the Lok Sabha, from Ichalkaranji in Maharashtra as a member of the Indian National Congress. 
Jaywantrao Awale, Ex-Minister of Social Justice of Maharashtra state and member of the 15th Lok Sabha, representing Latur constituency, for the Indian National Congress party.
Jayesh Bugad, international speed skater.
Balakrishnabuwa Ichalkaranjikar.  Indian vocalist of Khayal-genre of Hindustani classical music
Vikas Kharage, IAS, a very competent and versatile Indian Administrative Service (IAS) officer of Maharashtra Cadre of 1994 batch. He is native from Ichalkaranji and a popular administrator. Currently posted as Principal Secretary to Hon. Chief Minister of Maharashtra.
Subhash Khot, mathematician, theoretical computer scientist and Julius Silver Professor of Computer Science in the Courant Institute of Mathematical Sciences at New York University.
Ratnappa Kumbhar, Indian politician and independence activist. He was an MP, a member of the legislative council and Minister of food and civil supplies in Government of Maharashtra, received Padma Shri award in 1985 for his social work.

See also
 Ichalkaranji (Lok Sabha constituency)
 List of Maratha dynasties and states
 List of princely states of British India (by region)
 Maratha Empire
 Textile industry 
 Mughal Empire

References

External links
Cotton Times
 Kolhapur.gov.in/Economy Kolhapur Economy – Government of India

 
Textile industry in Maharashtra
Cities and towns in Kolhapur district
Cities in Maharashtra